U.S. Highway 90 Business (BUS US 90, officially 90-Y)  is a state highway in Louisiana that serves Lafayette Parish. It spans  in a northwest to southeast direction and it is signed as Business 90, with no directional shields.  It is known as University Avenue and Pinhook Road.  Most of the route follows the previous alignment of US 90 through downtown Lafayette.

Route description
From the northwest, Business US 90 begins south towards downtown Lafayette, paired with LA 182, eventually bypassing downtown.  The older alignment of US 90, it meets U.S. 167 (Johnston St.), and passes next to the University of Louisiana at Lafayette. After passing the university, US 90 Business turns to the north, while LA 182 turns to the south. US 90 Business then ends at an intersection with US 90/Future I-49.

Business US 90 is an undivided, four-lane highway for its entire length.

History
The current US 90 Business is the second such route in Lafayette.  The first existed in the 1940s and followed the original route of US 90 through the downtown area.  At this time, US 90 had been shifted onto University Avenue, the current business route.  By 1951, the original route of US 90 was restored, and the University Avenue route was designated as US 90 Bypass.  In 1956, the bypass designation was dropped, and US 90 followed the University Avenue route once again.  The current business route came into existence almost a decade later when US 90 was re-routed onto the Evangeline Thruway.

Major junctions

References

External links

LADOTD Official Control Section Map - District 03
Lafayette Parish Highway Map
Louisiana State Highway Log

90 Business (Lafayette)
Business (Lafayette, Louisiana)
Lafayette, Louisiana
90 Business (Lafayette, Louisiana)
Transportation in Lafayette Parish, Louisiana